The 1962 American Football League draft was held on December 2, 1961. With the first overall pick, the Oakland Raiders selected quarterback Roman Gabriel.

Order

Boston Patriots draft picks (selected sixth)

Buffalo Bills draft picks (selected fourth)

Dallas Texans draft picks (selected third)

Denver Broncos draft picks (selected second)

Houston Oilers draft picks (selected seventh)

New York Titans draft picks

San Diego Chargers draft picks (selected eighth)

* This pick was considered a "Future" selection.

Oakland Raiders draft picks

Notable undrafted players

See also
List of American Football League players
History of American Football League draft
List of professional American football drafts

References

External links
 1962 American Football League Draft list on Robert Phillips' site

1962
Draft
American Football League draft